Berry Gordy III (born November 28, 1929), known professionally as Berry Gordy Jr., is an American retired record executive, record producer, songwriter, film producer and television producer. He is best known as the founder of the Motown record label and its subsidiaries, which was the highest-earning African-American business for decades.

As a songwriter, Gordy composed or co-composed a number of hits including "Lonely Teardrops"  and "That's Why" (Jackie Wilson), "Shop Around" (The Miracles), and "Do You Love Me" (The Contours), all of which topped the US R&B charts, as well as the international hit "Reet Petite" (Jackie Wilson). As part of the Corporation, he wrote many hit songs for the Jackson 5, including "I Want You Back" and "ABC". As a record producer, he launched the Miracles and signed acts like the Supremes, Marvin Gaye, the Temptations, the Four Tops, Gladys Knight & the Pips, and Stevie Wonder. He was known for carefully directing the public image, dress, manners, and choreography of his acts.

Gordy was inducted into the Rock and Roll Hall of Fame in 1988, awarded the National Medal of Arts by President Barack Obama in 2016, and the Kennedy Center Honors in 2021. In 2022, he was inducted into the Black Music & Entertainment Walk of Fame.

Early years 
Berry Gordy III (also known as Berry Gordy Jr.) was the seventh of eight children (Fuller, Esther, Anna, Loucye, George, Gwen, Berry and Robert), born on November 28, 1929, in Detroit, to middle-class parents, Berry Gordy II (also known as Berry Gordy Sr.) and Bertha Fuller Gordy, who had relocated to Detroit from Oconee, Washington County, Georgia in 1922. 

His grandfather, named Berry Gordy I, was the son of James Gordy, a white plantation owner in Georgia, and a woman he enslaved. His half-brother, James (son of the elder James and his legal wife), was the grandfather of President Jimmy Carter. Berry Gordy II was led to Detroit both by the job opportunities offered by the booming automotive businesses, and also by worries over the atmosphere in the American South where black men were lynched "with chilling regularity by the Ku Klux Klan"; in the first twenty years of the twentieth century, 1,502 lynchings were reported, most in Southern states. Gordy's father opened a grocery store, owned a plastering and carpentry business, and a printing shop. While his brothers Fuller and George were happy to work at jobs their father assigned to them in construction and printing, Berry and Robert, the younger boys, were less inclined to follow that path. Both Robert and Berry liked dancing and music, but Berry's greatest interest was in boxing.

Gordy dropped out of Northeastern High School in the eleventh grade to become a professional boxer in hopes of becoming rich quickly; he boxed professionally until 1950, when he was drafted by the United States Army in 1951 for service in the Korean War. Arriving in Korea in May 1952, Gordy was first assigned to the 58th Field Artillery Battalion, 3rd Infantry Division, near Panmunjom. He later became a chaplain's assistant, driving a jeep and playing the organ at religious services at the front. His tour in the Korean War was completed in April 1953. He obtained a GED, which is equivalent to a high school diploma.

After his return from Korea in 1953, he married 19-year-old Thelma Louise Coleman in Toledo, Ohio. Gordy developed his interest in music by writing songs and opening the 3-D Record Mart, a record store featuring jazz music and 3-D glasses. The store was unsuccessful, and Gordy sought work at the Lincoln-Mercury plant, but his family connections put him in touch with Al Green (no relation to the singer Reverend Al Green), owner of the Flame Show Bar Talent Club, where he met the singer Jackie Wilson.

In 1957, Wilson recorded "Reet Petite", a song Gordy had co-written with his sister Gwen and writer-producer Billy Davis. It became a modest hit, but had more success internationally, especially in the UK, where it reached the Top 10 and even later topped the chart on re-issue in 1986. Wilson recorded six more songs co-written by Gordy over the next two years, including "Lonely Teardrops", which topped the R&B charts and got to number 7 in the pop chart. The Gordy siblings and Davis also wrote "All I Could Do Was Cry" for Etta James at Chess Records.

Motown Record Corporation 

Gordy reinvested the profits from his songwriting success into producing. In 1957, he discovered the Miracles (originally known as the Matadors) and began building a portfolio of successful artists. In 1959, with the encouragement of Miracles leader Smokey Robinson, Gordy borrowed $800 from his family to create an R&B record company. Originally, Gordy wanted to name the new label Tammy Records, after the song recorded by Debbie Reynolds. However, that name was taken, and he chose the name Tamla Records. The company began operating on January 12, 1959. "Come to Me" by Marv Johnson was issued as Tamla 101. United Artists Records picked up "Come to Me" for national distribution, as well as Johnson's more successful follow-up records such as "You Got What It Takes", co-produced by Gordy, who also received a co-writer credit, though the song was originally written and recorded by guitarist Bobby Parker for Vee-Jay Records a year and a half earlier. Gordy's next release was the only 45 ever issued on his Rayber label, featuring Wade Jones with an unnamed female backup group. The record did not sell well and is now one of the rarest issues from the Motown stable. Berry's third release was "Bad Girl" by the Miracles, the first release on the Motown record label. "Bad Girl" was a solid hit in 1959 after Chess Records picked it up. Barrett Strong's "Money (That's What I Want)" initially appeared on Tamla and then charted on Gordy's sister's label, Anna Records, in February 1960. It was The Miracles who gave the label its first million-selling hit single, with the 1960 Grammy Hall of Fame smash, "Shop Around" and this song, and its follow up hits,"You've Really Got a Hold on Me" (another Grammy Hall of Fame-inducted hit), "Mickey's Monkey","What's So Good About Goodbye", and "I'll Try Something New", made The Miracles the label's first stars.

The Tamla and Motown labels were then merged into a new company, Motown Record Corporation, incorporated on April 14, 1960. In 1960, Gordy signed an unknown singer, Mary Wells, who became the fledgling label's second star, with Smokey Robinson penning her hits "You Beat Me to the Punch", "Two Lovers", and "My Guy". The Miracles' hit "Shop Around" peaked at No. 1 on the national R&B charts in late 1960 and at No. 2 on the Billboard magazine pop charts on January 16, 1961 (No. 1 pop, Cash Box), which established Motown as an independent company worthy of notice. Later in 1961, the Marvelettes' "Please Mr. Postman" made it to the top of both charts.

Gordy's gift for identifying and bringing together musical talent, along with the careful management of his artists' public image, made Motown a major national and then international success. Over the next decade, he signed such artists as the Supremes, Marvin Gaye, the Temptations, Jimmy Ruffin, the Contours, the Four Tops, Gladys Knight & the Pips, the Commodores, the Velvelettes, Martha and the Vandellas, Stevie Wonder and the Jackson 5. Though he also signed some white acts to the label (Rare Earth, Rustix, via the Rare Earth label), he mainly promoted African American artists but carefully controlled their public image, dress, manners and choreography for across-the-board appeal.

Relocation to Los Angeles 
In 1972, Gordy relocated to Los Angeles, where he produced the commercially successful biographical drama film on Billie Holiday, Lady Sings the Blues, starring Diana Ross (who was nominated for an Academy Award), Richard Pryor, and Billy Dee Williams (cast in a role originally for Levi Stubbs of the Four Tops). Initially the studio, over Gordy's objections, rejected Williams after several screen tests. However, Gordy, known for his tenacity, eventually prevailed, and the film established Williams as a major movie star. Berry Gordy soon after produced and directed Mahogany (Tony Richardson was the original director, but Gordy fired Richardson and took over direction himself after a dispute over minor casting), also starring Ross and Williams. In 1985, he produced the cult martial arts film The Last Dragon, which starred martial artist Taimak and one of Prince's proteges, Vanity.

Although Motown continued to produce major hits throughout the 1970s and 1980s by artists including the Jacksons, Rick James, Commodores, Lionel Richie, and long-term signings Stevie Wonder and Smokey Robinson, the record company was no longer the major force it had been. Gordy sold his interests in Motown Records to MCA and Boston Ventures on June 28, 1988, for $61 million. He later sold most of his interests in Jobete publishing to EMI Publishing. Gordy wrote or co-wrote 240 of the approximately 15,000 songs in Motown's Jobete music catalogue. However, the true test of the label's worth would come a few years later, when Polygram paid over $330 million (Diana Ross was given shares in this version of the label) for the Motown catalog.

Gordy published an autobiography, To Be Loved, in 1994.

Awards and accolades 

Gordy was inducted into the Rock and Roll Hall of Fame in 1988. He was inducted into the Junior Achievement U.S. Business Hall of Fame in 1998 and the Michigan Rock and Roll Legends Hall of Fame in 2009.

When Gordy received the Songwriters Hall of Fame's Pioneer Award on June 13, 2013, he was the first living individual to receive the honor.

In 2016, Gordy received the National Medal of Arts from President Obama for "helping to create a trailblazing new sound in American music. As a record producer and songwriter, he helped build Motown, launching the music careers of countless legendary artists. His unique sound helped shape our Nation's story."

Berry Gordy Square in Los Angeles was designated by the City Council at intersection of Sunset Boulevard and Argyle where the office of Motown was located.

In 2021, he was awarded the Kennedy Center Honors alongside Bette Midler, Joni Mitchell, Justino Díaz, and Lorne Michaels.

In 2022, he was inducted into the Black Music & Entertainment Walk of Fame.

In 2022, he was awarded with an honorary doctorate from the University of Michigan.

Statements about Motown artists 
Following the funeral of Marvin Gaye on April 5, 1984, Gordy declared Gaye "the greatest of his time."  Berry said the singer "had no musical equals," while also discussing how he carried on the legacy of other soul singers who tackled a range of themes, from love to civil rights, such as Billie Holiday.

On March 20, 2009, Gordy was in Hollywood to pay tribute to his first group and first million-selling act, the Miracles, when the members received a star on the Hollywood Walk of Fame. Speaking in tribute to the group, Gordy said: "Without the Miracles, Motown would not be the Motown it is today."

At the age of 79, Gordy spoke at the memorial service for Michael Jackson in Los Angeles on July 7, 2009. He suggested that "The King of Pop" was perhaps not the best description for Jackson in light of his achievements, referring to him instead as "the greatest entertainer that ever lived."

Motown: The Musical
On May 15, 2011, it was announced that Gordy was developing a Broadway musical about Motown. The show is said to be an account of events of the 1960s and how they shaped the creation of the label. Gordy hoped that the musical would improve the reputation of Motown Records and clear up any misconceptions regarding the label's demise.

Motown: The Musical began previews at the Lunt-Fontanne Theatre on March 11, 2013, and began regular performances there on April 14.
The musical closed in January 2015.

The UK version of Motown: The Musical opened in London's West End in January 2016. Berry Gordy was present at the opening night.

Personal life 

Gordy, who was married and divorced three times, has eight children with six different women. His publishing company, Jobete, was named after his three eldest children: Joy, Berry and Terry.

He had three children with his first wife, Thelma Coleman, whom he married in 1953 (they were divorced in 1959):
 Hazel Joy Gordy (born August 24, 1954), was once married to Jermaine Jackson
 Berry Gordy IV (born October 1955), father to Skyler Austen Gordy
 Terry James Gordy (born August 1956)

In the spring of 1960 he married Raynoma Mayberry Liles (they were divorced in 1964). They had one son:
 Kerry Gordy (born June 25, 1959)
With Jeana Jackson, Gordy had one daughter:
 Sherry Gordy (born May 23, 1963)
With his then-mistress Margaret Norton, Gordy had a son who would later become more popularly known as Motown musician Rockwell:
 Kennedy William Gordy (born March 15, 1964)
Gordy had a daughter with Motown artist Diana Ross, with whom he had an intimate relationship from 1965 through 1970:
 Rhonda Suzanne (born August 14, 1971; her legal father is Robert Ellis Silberstein under California family law)
Gordy's eighth and youngest child is a son born to Nancy Leiviska. He is known by his stage name, Redfoo, as one member of the duo LMFAO (the other member is Skyler Gordy, born August 23, 1986, and known professionally as SkyBlu; he is the grandson of Gordy and Thelma Coleman through their son Berry IV and his wife, Valerie Robeson):
 Stefan Kendal Gordy (born September 3, 1975)

Berry married Grace Eaton on July 17, 1990; they divorced in 1993.

He is also related to former US President Jimmy Carter. His relationship with Carter stems from his white great-grandfather James Thomas Gordy who owned a black, female slave.

Vistas Stables 
Berry Gordy owned the colt Powis Castle whom he raced under the nom de course Vistas Stables. Racing in California, Powis Castle won the 1994 Oceanside Stakes and Malibu Stakes then finished 8th in the Kentucky Derby and 9th in the Preakness Stakes, the first two legs of the U.S. Triple Crown series.

Film

Broadway

In popular culture 
 Gordy was portrayed by Billy Dee Williams (whose career Gordy had helped to jump-start in the 1970s) in the 1992 miniseries The Jacksons: An American Dream.
 Gordy was portrayed by Obba Babatunde in the 1998 miniseries The Temptations.  He also plays a key role in Ain't Too Proud, which tells the story of The Temptations in a musical format.  
 The character Gordy Berry (also played by Babatunde) in The Fresh Prince of Bel-Air is a reference to Berry Gordy.
 The character of Curtis Taylor Jr., a music executive in the 2006 musical film Dreamgirls, has been called "a thinly veiled portrayal" of Gordy. The film was based on the 1981 musical Dreamgirls, but the film made the connection to Gordy and Motown much more explicit than the musical did, by, among other things, moving the setting of the story from Chicago to Detroit. Taylor appears in the film as unethical and insensitive to his artists, which caused Gordy and others to criticize the film after its release. Gordy called the portrayal "100% wrong," while Smokey Robinson said it "blatantly painted a negative picture of Motown and Berry Gordy and of the Supremes." In 2007, the producers of the film, DreamWorks and Paramount Pictures, issued a public apology to Gordy, saying they were sorry "for any confusion that has resulted from our fictional work." Gordy accepted the apology.
 Gordy was portrayed by Brandon Victor Dixon in the 2013 stage play production Motown: The Musical.

See also 

 Album era
 List of songs written by Berry Gordy

References

Sources

External links 
 
 
 
 
 
 

1929 births
Living people
20th-century American businesspeople
20th-century American male musicians
21st-century American businesspeople
21st-century American male musicians
African-American businesspeople
African-American record producers
African-American songwriters
American autobiographers
American male songwriters
American music industry executives
American racehorse owners and breeders
Businesspeople from Detroit
Businesspeople from Michigan
Gordy family
Kennedy Center honorees
Motown
Motown artists
Musicians from Detroit
Northeastern High School (Michigan) alumni
Record producers from Michigan
Songwriters from Michigan
United States Army personnel of the Korean War
United States Army soldiers
United States National Medal of Arts recipients